Birmingham School of Acting (BSA), previously known as Birmingham School of Speech Training and Dramatic Art (BSSTDA) and then as Birmingham School of Speech and Drama (BSSD) was a drama school located in Birmingham, England. It was founded in 1936 by Pamela Chapman and became a faculty of Birmingham City University in 2005. In September 2006, it moved from Paradise Place to a purpose-built facility at Millennium Point in the city's Eastside area. In 2008, it became a school of the university's Faculty of Performance, Media and English (PME), and in September 2017 it merged to become part of the Royal Birmingham Conservatoire.

The school provided a range of part-time, summer school and short courses for adults and children. The school was accredited by Drama UK and was a member of the Council of Drama Schools.

Alumni of the school included Ashley Rice, Nicol Williamson, Tom Lister, Catherine Tyldesley, Rachel Bright, Barbara Keogh, Luke Mably, James Bradshaw, Stephen Laughton, Jeffrey Holland, David Holt, Anna Brewster, Jimi Mistry, Helen George, Perry Cree, Ainsley Howard, Tania Hales-Richardson, Carole Boyd, Rosemary Pountney and Nicholas Gledhill.

References

External links 
Official site

acting
Drama schools in Birmingham, West Midlands
Educational institutions established in 1936
1936 establishments in the United Kingdom
2017 disestablishments in the United Kingdom